Ang Dorje (Chhuldim) Sherpa (born 1970) is a Nepali sherpa mountaineering guide, climber, and porter from Pangboche, Nepal, who has climbed to the summit of Mount Everest 21 times. He was the climbing Sirdar for Rob Hall's Adventure Consultants expedition to Everest in spring 1996, when a freak storm led to the deaths of eight climbers from several expeditions, considered one of the worst disasters in the history of Everest mountaineering.

Early life 

Ang Dorje was born in 1970, in upper Pangboche, Nepal, near the  Khumbu Valley as it passes down the slopes of Mount Everest. He grew up among Himalayan climbers; his father, Nima Tenzing Sherpa, was a climber with expeditions led by British mountaineer Chris Bonington in the 1970s and 1980s.

He followed his father in work with climbing expeditions beginning as a porter at the age of 12.  "I always wanted to climb when I was little," Ang Dorje says.  He attended private school in Nepal, with assistance from western clients impressed by his work ethic, as he continued his mountaineering work with several expeditions in the Everest area. His efforts were rewarded when in 1992 at the age of 22 he reached the summit of Mount Everest.

Sirdar and guiding career 

Ang Dorje has led many successful expeditions on Everest, frequently as climbing sirdar for Adventure Consultants, the guiding service founded by Rob Hall. During the disastrous 1996 expedition on Everest, he and Lhakpa Tshering Sherpa attempted to rescue Hall and others, in the deadly storm conditions that ultimately killed 8 climbers. They ascended 900 vertical meters to just below Everest's South Summit, only to be halted by impenetrable storm conditions just 100 meters from Hall. They waited 45 minutes before being forced back by the storm. Ang Dorje later commented on the incident saying, "It was very sad. Very difficult." The rescue efforts were recounted by Jon Krakauer in his account of the disaster, Into Thin Air.

In addition to his work as climbing sirdar on Everest, Ang Dorje has also worked as a mountain guide on Everest, as well as Aconcagua, Mount Rainier, Kilimanjaro, and Island Peak.

He first guided Bachendri Pal, the first Indian woman to reach the summit of Mount Everest, in 1984, when he climbed Mount Everest for the second time.

Climbing accomplishments 

As of 2020, Ang Dorje had reached the summit of Mount Everest 20 times since 1992 (in both spring and autumn, all via the South Col route), Cho Oyu seven times since 1995, and had also summited Broad Peak (1995), Gasherbrum II (1997) and Ama Dablam (in 1996, via the southwest ridge route)

Personal life 

After meeting American computational linguist Michelle Gregory at the southern Everest Base Camp, in 2002 he immigrated to the United States. The couple wed a year later.  He returns to climb Everest each spring, in part to be able to visit family as he passes on the way to the mountain.  He completed his 19th summit of Everest in 2017.   Ang Dorje also works as a wind turbine mechanic at wind farms in the Pacific Northwest region of the United States.

He spent time in 19971998 climbing in Jotunheimen in Norway with amongst others his friend Morten Skjellen-Larsen.

Everest summits
 2019 - 20th summit 
 2017 - 19th summit 
 2016 - 18th summit with Adventure Consultants
 2013 - 17th summit
 2008 - 14th summit

See also
 List of Mount Everest summiters by number of times to the summit
 List of 20th-century summiters of Mount Everest

References

External links
 Death and survival on top of the world: Sherpa guide recalls the tragic 1996 Everest expedition

1970 births
Living people
Sherpa summiters of Mount Everest
Nepalese mountain climbers
People from Solukhumbu District
Nepalese emigrants to the United States
Nepalese summiters of Mount Everest